Christer Engelhardt (born 23 October 1969 in Region Gotland) is a Swedish social democratic politician who has been a member of the Riksdag since 2002.

References
Christer Engelhardt (S)

1969 births
Living people
Members of the Riksdag from the Social Democrats
Members of the Riksdag 2002–2006